John Thompson (July 4, 1809 – June 1, 1890) was a U.S. Representative from New York. Born in Rhinebeck, New York, he studied law, was admitted to the bar and commenced practice in Poughkeepsie, New York. He was elected as a Republican to the Thirty-fifth Congress (March 4, 1857 – March 3, 1859). He did not run for reelection in 1858, and resumed the practice of law.

Thompson was one of the first trustees of Vassar College, and served from 1861 to 1885. He was also president of the Falkill National Bank. He received honorary Master of Arts degrees from Union College in Schenectady, New York and Yale College.

He died in New Hamburg, New York on June 1, 1890. He was interred in Poughkeepsie Rural Cemetery.

Sources

External links

1809 births
1890 deaths
Union College (New York) alumni
Yale University alumni
New York (state) lawyers
Burials at Poughkeepsie Rural Cemetery
Republican Party members of the United States House of Representatives from New York (state)
19th-century American politicians
19th-century American lawyers